Hsinchu American School (HAS) is private, international school with a largely based American curriculum located in East District, Hsinchu City, Taiwan. It was founded in 2004 by Glory Yeh, a Taiwanese real estate developer. HAS offers instruction in English for students grades 1-12. It is recognized by American Institute in Taiwan and the Taiwan Ministry of Education.

History
The Hsinchu American School began operations in 2005. Originally HAS was on the top floor of a 4 story open-center building shared with Sagor Bilingual School. In 2017 HAS moved to its own building and now operates on its own campus, which includes HAS's own athletic facilities.

Campus

HAS is located in the National Art Park with the following facilities:
Basketball Courts
Soccer Field
Indoor Badminton Court
Weight Room
Dance Studio
Science Lab
Computer Lab
Rock Band Room
Art Room
Library
Cafeteria
Student Store

Student body

HAS currently has enrollment open for grades 1-12. HAS abides by Taiwan Foreign Schools Law, which requires all international schools to only admit students who hold non-Taiwan passports.

See also 

Taipei American School
National Experimental High School
Morrison Academy
American School in Taichung
Kaohsiung American School
Hsinchu International School
Taipei Adventist American School
Taiwan Adventist International School
The Primacy Collegiate Academy

References

External links 
Hsinchu American School

2005 establishments in Taiwan
American international schools in Taiwan
Educational institutions established in 2005
Schools in Hsinchu